The Cheap Thrills are an English indie rock band from Liverpool, England. Formed in 2010, the band signed to Eighties Vinyl Records in 2017 and have released 7” EP, Glare, in January 2017, and 12” mini album Vue Du Monde, in November 2019 in both the United Kingdom and the United States.

Background 
The band was formed in 2010 in the Walton area of Liverpool by schoolmates Anton Eager and Callum Fitzpatrick, who were eventually joined by Terry Eaves and Lewis Pike to complete the lineup. The band made their first notable appearances in 2012 at both Kendal Calling Festival and Liverpool Sound City. In 2013, the band was named as one of The Guardian'''s Breaking Bands. The following five years saw the band touring and playing support slots with bands such as Cast, Jamie Webster The Real People, The Night Cafe, and DMA's. The band signed to Eighties Vinyl Records in 2017 and released a 7” EP, Glare. This received acclaim from Gigwise and Rough Trade USA. Blak Hand Records released a limited edition cassette version of the EP.

The band signed a management deal with End Of The Trail Creative in 2018 and released the single "Sentimentality",  which saw the band receive their first national radio play on BBC Radio 6 Music from Steve Lamacq. This was followed by "Codependence", which was named as one of Louder Than War's tracks of the year. 2019 saw the band release the EP Vue Du Monde on the Eighties Vinyl Label, which received national radio play from BBC Radio 6 Music DJs Steve Lamacq, Tom Robinson, and John Kennedy of Radio X.

Since then, the band has performed at BBC 6 Music Festival, The Great Escape, and Liverpool International Music Festival. In March 2020, the band made their US debut at New Colossus Festival in New York City.

An acoustic version of the band’s track “Codependence” was used as the soundtrack for Liverpool Football Club’s 2022/2023 European kit. With the bands lyrics “We’ll follow for a lifetime and a day” as the campaigns tagline. 

In 2022, The Cheap Thrills won “Liverpool Band of The Year Award 2022” presented by Sound Music Group. 

Band members
 Lewis Pike - vocals, guitar
 Anton Eger - drums, percussion
 Terry Eaves - guitar, keyboards, synthesisers
 Callum Fitzpatrick - bass guitar

Discography
Singles
"Same Old Faces" (2017) 
"Sentimentality" (2018) 
"Codependence" (2018) 
"Saint or Sinner" (2019) 
"Party" (2020) 

Extended plays
 Glare 7" EP (2017) 
 Vue Du Monde'' 12" EP (2019)

See also
List of bands and artists from Merseyside

References

English indie rock groups
Musical groups from Liverpool
Musical groups established in 2010
2010 establishments in England